Cherangany Constituency (also spelled Cherangani Constituency), comprises the larger Trans Nzoia East District; otherwise known as Cherangani Sub-County, with an approximate area of 556.9 square km. It is an electoral constituency in Kenya, which was established/created for the 1988 general election.

It comprises seven county assembly wards, each electing a member of the county assembly (MCA) for the Trans-Nzoia County Assembly.

It is one of five constituencies in Trans-Nzoia County. The constituency was established for the 1988 Kenyan general election. Prior to the 1988 Kenyan general election, it was known as Kitale East Constituency, and was represented in the national assembly by Hon Masinde Muliro and earlier on by Hon Fred Gumo.

Hon Muliro is narrowly re-elected in the infamous 1988 (Public Queue Voting), despite mass rigging elsewhere. Immediately, his election is nullified and he loses the ensuing by-election to a Kalenjin newcomer Hon Kirwa.

Members of Parliament

Wards

References 

Constituencies in Trans-Nzoia County
Constituencies in Rift Valley Province
1988 establishments in Kenya
Constituencies established in 1988